Luciano Masiello  (born 2 January 1951) is an Italian former professional footballer who played as a winger in England, Ireland and Italy.

Playing career
Masiello joined Charlton Athletic as a school boy in 1962 and came through the youth teams and reserves until he made his first team debut in a friendly against Dutch team FC Den Bosch in 1968, another first team outing followed against a very strong Italian under 21 team in a friendly at the valley until making his full first team league debut in December 1969 against Norwich City winning 3–0. He went on to make eight league appearances and two substitute appearances for Charlton Athletic and scored one goal against West Bromwich Albion in a league cup match at the Hawthorns. He had a loan spell with Athlone Town in Ireland, playing in the FIA league of Ireland Cup Final

He played in Italy for six seasons making 179 appearances for Almas Roma, Frosinone Calcio S.S. Lazio and SS Francavilla.

Managerial career
Masiello coached for a number of years in Italy before returning to England. Luciano had spells as manager at Andover F.C. and was a player/coach at Woking F.C. and Bromley F.C. He also discovered the talent of Emeka Nwajiobi.

Masiello decided to leave football as his family and businesses grew. He always had a passion for food so he  bought and sold a number of restaurants until his retirement in 2015.

External links
 Profile at Charlton Athletic Former Player's Association

1951 births
Living people
Sportspeople from the Province of Benevento
Italian footballers
Association football wingers
League of Ireland players
Charlton Athletic F.C. players
Athlone Town A.F.C. players
S.S. Lazio players
Frosinone Calcio players
Italian football managers
Andover F.C. managers
Woking F.C. managers
Bromley F.C. managers
Italian expatriate footballers
Italian expatriate football managers
Italian expatriate sportspeople in Ireland
Expatriate association footballers in the Republic of Ireland
Italian expatriate sportspeople in England
Expatriate footballers in England
Expatriate football managers in England
Footballers from Campania